Gaffney v. Cummings, 412 U.S. 735 (1973), is a Supreme Court decision upholding statewide legislative apportionment plans for Connecticut.  The Court admitted that these plans entailed "substantial inequalities in the population of the representative districts." It observed that "the States have made virtually no attempt to justify their failure 'to construct districts ... as nearly of equal population as is practicable." It was a Fourteenth Amendment case. At issue was whether the election districts had been gerrymandered in violation of the Fourteenth Amendment to the Constitution.

Facts and prior history
The various states were eligible, and in some cases required, to redraw certain House districts and state assembly districts as a result of the 1970 Census. Connecticut's assembly has 30 senators and 151 house members.  A perfect apportionment would have had 84,228 citizens per senate seat and 20,081 per assembly seat. In Connecticut, the township is the primary unit of government, not the county.  The districting commission developed a plan that almost perfectly divided the state into thirty senate districts (mean deviation 0.45%, or +/- 400). The plan for the assembly, respecting the township boundaries as required by the state constitution, had a mean deviation of 1.9%, with the maximum difference between districts 7.83%. The Court did not discuss the choice of townships that composed each district, only the imbalance in size.  A voter in a small district would have more influence than a voter in a large district.  In other cases, the court had found deviations of 5.97% and 13.1% unacceptable.

Democrats alleged the plan amounted to a political gerrymander and was biased in favor of the Republican Party. The District Court had found against the plan—and by extension, the Republicans.  J. Brian Gaffney was chairman of the state Republican Party and is the named petitioner in this case. Theodore R. Cummings was a long-time Connecticut Democrat, before he died in 2015.

Court decision

The Supreme Court's decision was announced on March 18, 1973, and delivered by Justice White. The Connecticut districting system, with mean deviation of 1.9%, was approved.

Minor deviations from mathematical equality among state legislative districts are insufficient to make out a prima facie case of invidious discrimination under the Fourteenth Amendment so as to require justification by the State.

Implications
For the past fifty years, the two principal guidelines for determining whether a state redistricting plan is fair are: 
One man's vote in a congressional election is to be worth as much as another's

A State must make an honest and good faith effort to construct its districts as nearly of equal population as is practicable, but that absolute equality was a practical impossibility. Mathematical exactness or precision is hardly a workable constitutional requirement.

Subsequent analysis of the facts of the case provided analysts arguments against First-past-the-post voting systems.

In 2019, the Court addressed partisan redistricting in Rucho v. Common Cause and Lamone v. Benisek, and determined that partisan redistricting was outside of the jurisdiction of the federal judiciary, due to it presenting political questions.

References

See also

 Fourteenth Amendment

External links
 

Incorporation case law
United States Supreme Court cases
United States Supreme Court cases of the Burger Court
Legal history of Connecticut
1973 in United States case law
United States electoral redistricting case law